The dwarf fruit dove (Ptilinopus nainus) is a species of bird in the family Columbidae. It is found in lowland and foothill forest in New Guinea and the Raja Ampat Islands.The dwarf fruit dove weighs 49 grams, about equivalent to the weight of two AA batteries This bird is the smallest of the fruit dove genus

Description 
With a total length of 13–15 cm (5.1–5.9 in), it is the shortest pigeon or dove in the world, but as it is thickset, several other species weigh less. Its plumage is overall green, but with contrasting yellow undertail-coverts, and narrow bars to the wings. Although, the inner wing-coverts and secondaries are more bluish compared to the rest of the body. This bluish-green coloring is most prominent on the scapulars, which are the body feathers that cover the top of the wing when the bird is at rest. The males differ in color and plumage from the female. The males have a dark purple patch on the belly and tend to have a gray patch on both sides of their upper breasts. Both males and females have a yellowish-green beak and purplish-red legs, in addition to a yellow area on their abdomen and undertail coverts. The juvenile fruit doves resemble the colorings of the females, yet they have yellow fringes on most of their plumage. Eventually this yellow fringe will disappear, and the birds will resemble their gender colorings.These fruit doves will often be found in pairs of their own species, and sometimes intermingling with other fruit dove species.

Sounds 
Dwarf fruit doves will communicate with each other using a high-pitched, slow, soft, and prolonged up slur. With a one-second pause, the sound is repeated about six times.  Their call resembles a “oh-wah” sound.

Habitat 
The habitat of the dwarf fruit dove is forests in the lowlands and foothills of New Guinea, excluding northwestern New Guinea and the north coast of southeastern New Guinea. Additionally, they are found in the Raja Ampat islands off the coast of Northwestern New Guinea. They have been most found in hills up to 1100 meters. They can also be found at Varirata National Park in New Guinea.

Population and Movement 
The dwarf fruit dove has a stable population, meaning its growth rate and its relative age distribution is not changing over time. Also, it is not globally threatened. It is under the Least Concern category of the IUCN red list. The dwarf fruit dove is scarce, but not rare. The population size is unknown. The movement of the dwarf fruit dove is stationary in Port Moresby, New Guinea but migrant in Tabubil.

Breeding 
The dwarf fruit dove's nests have been found in September and November. Nests are found at varying heights in small trees from 3 meters above ground to 12 meters above ground. These nests are built by the female bird using twigs and dead leaves collected by the male.

Diet 
90 percent of their diet comes from fruit, whereas the other 10 percent comes from nectar. The dwarf fruit dove can be considered a frugivore and nectarivore.   

When 8 dwarf fruit doves were captured and monitored, they only ate figs during their captivity.

References

dwarf fruit dove
Birds of New Guinea
dwarf fruit dove
Taxonomy articles created by Polbot